Richard I de Vernon, Lord of Shipbrook, was an 11th-century noble. He held lands within Cheshire and Norfolk in England as lord and tenant in chief. Richard was succeeded by his son William.

Biography
Richard’s younger brother Walter died without issue and he inherited some of Walter’s lands. He gave the tithes of Aston and Picton to the Abbey of St. Werburgh at Cheshire in 1093. He was created baron of Shipbrook by Hugh d'Avranches, Earl of Chester. Richard is sometimes confused with his contemporary Richard de Redvers, who was also known as Richard de Vernon and held Mosterton in Dorset in 1086.

Notes

Citations

References

11th-century English people
Richard I